Paula Wynne Stephens Lambert (born July 5, 1943, in Santa Maria, California) is an American artisanal cheesemaker, author and teacher. Lambert grew up in Fort Worth, Texas and spent some time as a college student in Perugia, Italy studying art history. After college, she returned to Italy to live for a time and enjoyed the fresh mozzarella available there. In 1982, she founded the Mozzarella Company in Dallas, Texas. She is the author of two books on cheese and teaches cooking classes.

Accolades
Lambert was listed in Who's Who in Food and Wine in Texas in 1988 and received the Roundtable for Women in Foodservice's Pacesetter Award in 1992. In 1998, she was listed in the James Beard Foundation's Who's Who in Food and Beverage in America. In 2005, she received the Career Achievement Award from Mary Baldwin College in Staunton, Virginia. In 2022, Les Dames d'Escoffier recognized Lambert with the Grande Dame Lifetime Achievement Award for extraordinary lifetime contributions within the food, beverage and hospitality industries.

Bibliography

References

External links
Mozzarella Company official site

1943 births
Living people
American chefs
American food writers
Mary Baldwin University alumni
People from Santa Maria, California
Businesspeople from Texas
Writers from Texas

20th-century American businesspeople